Great Books programs in Canada are university/college programs inspired by the Great Books movement begun in the United States in the 1920s.  The aim of such programs is to return to the Western Liberal Arts tradition in education. Those who mount such programs consider them to be corrective of what they perceive to be an extreme disciplinary specialisation common within the academy.

The essential component of such programs is a high degree of engagement with the Western canon of whole primary texts deemed to be essential for a student's education. The canon includes books such as Plato's Republic and Dante's Divine Comedy.  Great Books programs often focus exclusively on Western culture.  Their employment of primary texts dictates an interdisciplinary approach, as most of the Great Books do not fall neatly under the scope of a single contemporary academic discipline.

Great Books programs often include designated discussion groups as well as lectures, and have small class sizes.  Students in these programs usually receive an abnormally high degree of attention from their professors, as part of the overall aim of fostering a community of learning.

List of Great Books programs in Canada
Great Books programs in Canada include:

Newfoundland
 Memorial University's Grenfell Campus, in Cornerbrook, has a Humanities program.

Nova Scotia
 The University of King's College in Halifax mounts Canada's oldest Great Books program, the first-year Foundation Year Programme, in which students spend their entire first year reading key primary texts from the Ancient Near East to the Contemporary World.
 St. Francis Xavier University offers a first-year Great-Books curriculum called the Humanities Colloquium.

New Brunswick
 St. Thomas University in Fredericton has a Great Books program called the Great Books Program. The University also runs an interdisciplinary Great Books program exclusively for first-year students called The Aquinas Program.

Quebec
 The Liberal Arts College at Concordia University in Montreal offers a 3-year bachelor's degree in the Great Books.
 Laval University in Quebec City offers, in French, a one-year program in Great Books. The program is called "Certificat sur les oeuvres marquantes de la culture occidentale"

Ontario
 The College of the Humanities at Carleton University in Ottawa offers Canada's most in-depth Great Books program, as a 4-year honours degree called the Bachelor of Humanities, focusing on Philosophy, Literature, Religion, History, and Political Theory, with required courses in the History of Art and the History of Music.  Its main focus is on Western Culture, but it has a significant Eastern component.  Students regularly do a combined honours degree in Humanities and a more specialised discipline. The College of the Humanities also offers a combined honours in Humanities and Biology, designed for students heading to medical school. With the School of Journalism at Carleton, they also offer a joint Journalism and Humanities degree.  
 The Arts & Science Program at McMaster University has three mandatory, core courses in the spirit of Great Books:
 Western Civilization, roughly covering from the Enûma Eliš and Book of Genesis to Renaissance thinkers
 Modern Western Civilization, roughly covering from Thomas Aquinas to contemporary thinkers like Stanley Fish
 Literature, roughly covering from Homeric epics to Christa Wolf's Cassandra
 The Foundations in the Humanities Program at King's University College is a first-year Great Books program.

British Columbia
 Vancouver Island University in Nanaimo has offered a Bachelor of Arts degree with a major and minor in Liberal Studies since 1991. The Liberal Studies courses are interdisciplinary, seminar-based and team-taught; they deal primarily but not exclusively with the Western tradition, focus on the development of critical skills and include hands-on art and science.
 University of British Columbia in Vancouver has offered the Arts One course since 1967. It is a team-taught, interdisciplinary course for first-year students that consists of a once weekly lecture, twice weekly seminar of 20 students, and once weekly tutorials of four students doing peer evaluation of each other's essays. Students read approximately a book a week, of which many would be considered "great books," within and beyond the Western tradition.

Further reading
 Emberley, Peter C. and Newell, W.R., Bankrupt Education: The Decline of Liberal Education in Canada.  Toronto: University of Toronto Press, May 1994.
 Kay, Barbara, "Higher education's best-kept secret." National Post  (Canada).  Wednesday, November 19, 2008.

See also
 Great Books
 Liberal Arts
 Liberal Arts College
 Humanities
 Western canon

External links
 John Searle, "The Storm Over the University," The New York Review of Books, December 6, 1990
 Great Books Homepage

Education in Canada